Oświęcim Basin is a lowland, located in southern Poland, between the Lesser Poland Highlands to the north, Silesian Foothills and  to the south. Its name comes from the city of Oświęcim. It is located on the Vistula River on the confluences of Biała, Soła and Skawa which begin in Carpathian Mountains and Przemsza which begins in Silesian Highlands.

References 

Landforms of Poland